is a railway station on the Amagi Line located in Ogōri, Fukuoka Prefecture, Japan. It is operated by the Amagi Railway, a third sector public-private partnership corporation.

Lines
All Amagi Line trains stop at the station.

Layout
The station consists of an island platform serving two tracks. The station building located by the side of the tracks is a small prefabricated structure which is unstaffed and serves only as a waiting room. Access to the island platform is by means of a level crossing with steps at both ends.

Platforms

Adjacent stations

History
On 1 April 1986, control of the station was handed over to the Amagi Railway. The name of the station was changed to Matsuzaki on the same day.

Surrounding area 
 Matsuzaki Post Office
 Mii High School
 Oita Expressway
 Japan National Route 500

References

Railway stations in Fukuoka Prefecture
Railway stations in Japan opened in 1939